"Jet Lag" a song by Canadian rock band Simple Plan. It was released on April 25, 2011, as the second single from their fourth studio album Get Your Heart On!. Coeur de Pirate co-wrote the song with Simple Plan and a demo was recorded with her voice.

Four official versions exist, one featuring British singer Natasha Bedingfield providing guest vocals in English, another one featuring French-Canadian singer Marie-Mai, providing guest vocals in French; a version in Chinese featuring Chinese pop singer Kelly Cha, and an Indonesian version featuring Kotak lead vocalist Tantri Syalindri.

Critical reception
In a review in the Entertainment Weekly magazine, the song received a "B+" rating. The review commented that the song is a "surprisingly lovely pop-punk pounder about intercontinental relationships." Joe DeAndrea from AbsolutePunk said that "Jet Lag is Simple Plan's first big single in a long time, almost in vein of No Pads' "I'd Do Anything." Not as rocking, but packs the same similar punch." Davey Boy from Sputnikmusic was also positive, saying that "English pop songstress Natasha Bedingfield fares best with the call and response vocals of 'Jet Lag' making for an effective radio pop-rocker that plies the oft-used theme of long-distance relationships."

Music video
The music video for "Jet Lag" was filmed at Toronto Sheraton Gateway Hotel and Toronto Pearson International Airport and released on May 4, 2011. In the video, the band performs within the airport. In addition, lead singer Pierre Bouvier and Natasha Bedingfield play a long-distance relationship couple. After Pierre mails Natasha a postcard from Chicago (the music video's implied setting), he boards a flight to see her. While Westjet is the airline that prominently features in the video, an Air Canada Boeing 777 is seen taking off at the ending. Two SkyTeam airlines are also featured; a KLM Boeing 747-400 is seen landing at the beginning while the tailfin of a Korean Air Boeing 777 is visible at the 2:04 mark.

The band also released a Mandarin Chinese  version of "Jet Lag" featuring Chinese pop star Kelly Cha.

Another music video for Jet Lag which features Tantri Sylandri at Jakarta, Indonesia and next one with Marie Mai Bouchard replacing Natasha Bedingfield above with French next one with 2 Aussie girls at Sydney & Melbourne simultaneously

The last video has 2 girls combining French & English together at 2 rooms not one singing in unison.

Versions
As well as the two main versions featuring either Natasha Bedingfield or Marie-Mai, there have been many other versions performed live with other artists.

Simple Plan performed Jet Lag live with Fefe Dobson at the 2011 MuchMusic Video Awards on June 19, 2011.

On September 29, 2011, Australian singer Vanessa Amorosi sang the female lines at the AFL Footy Show Grand Final which was held at Rod Laver Arena in Melbourne, Australia.

During Simple Plan's Australian Tour in 2011, Jenna McDougall from Australian punk-rock band "Tonight Alive" was featured in Jet Lag, as Tonight Alive were Simple Plan's support band.

A version with Chinese singer Kelly Cha was also released on December 27, 2011, with Kelly Cha providing guest vocals in Chinese.

Another version with Indonesian band Kotak with lead vocalist Tantri was also released on December 29, 2011, with Tantri providing guest vocals in English, but had only been uploaded in Warner Music Indonesia's YouTube channel.

A demo version was also released with Coeur de Pirate providing guest vocals.

Other live versions have been performed with Christina Parie, Chantal Kreviazuk, My Tam, and Saidah Baba Talibah.

Track listings
Digital download - Single
 "Jet Lag" (featuring Natasha Bedingfield) – 3:25
 "Jet Lag" (featuring Marie-Mai) – 3:24

Digital download - Single feat. Kelly Cha version
 "Jet Lag" (feat. Kelly Cha) – 3:22

Charts

Weekly charts

Year-end charts

Certifications

Release history

References

Simple Plan songs
2011 singles
French-language songs
Male–female vocal duets
Songs written by Chuck Comeau
Songs written by Nolan Sipe
Songs written by Pierre Bouvier